Swett Ranch, in Daggett County, Utah southwest of Dutch John, has buildings dating from 1909.  A  section of the ranch was listed on the National Register of Historic Places in 1979.  It included nine contributing buildings and three contributing structures.

Historic function: Domestic; Industry/processing/extraction; Agriculture/subsistence
Historic subfunction: Processing; Single Dwelling; Agricultural Outbuildings; Animal Facility; Manufacturing Facility; Secondary Structure; Storage
Criteria: event, architecture/engineering

It includes a largely original corral built in 1905 for collecting Oscar Swett's cattle, before he homesteaded there.

References

Ranches in Utah
National Register of Historic Places in Daggett County, Utah
Buildings and structures completed in 1909
Corrals